Jakubowski, Yakubovsky, Yakubovskiy, Yakubovskii or Iakubovskii is a Slavic masculine surname of Polish origin. Its feminine counterpart is Jakubowska, Yakubovskaya or Iakubovskaia. It is a toponymic surname derived from any of the places named Jakubowo, Jakubów, Jakubowice and literally meaning "of Jakubowo", etc. The places themselves mean "belonging to Jakub".

Notable people with this surname include:
 Alexander Yakubovsky (born 1985), Russian politician
 Angelika Jakubowska, Polish model
 Anna Jakubowska (born 1927), Polish World War II combatant
 Bernd Jakubowski (1952–2007), German association football player
 Dmitry Yakubovskiy (born 1963), Russian businessman
 Franz Jakubowski (1912–1970), Polish–German philosopher
 Fuad Yakubovsky (1908–1975), Soviet Communist party functionary and statesman
 Gerald Jakubowski, American engineer, president of the Rose–Hulman Institute of Technology
 Igor Jakubowski (born 1992), Polish boxer
 Ivan Yakubovsky, (1912–1976), Soviet military leader
 Maxim Jakubowski (born 1944), British writer
 Thad J. Jakubowski (1924–2013), American Roman Catholic bishop
 Krystyna Jakubowska (born 1942), Polish volleyball player
 Wanda Jakubowska (1907–1998), Polish film director

References

Surnames from given names

Polish-language surnames
Polish toponymic surnames